Latrobe (formerly, La Trobe) is an unincorporated community in El Dorado County, California. Today a small community, in its heyday it was an important railroad town with a population of 700 to 800.

Latrobe was the terminus of the Placerville and Sacramento Rail Road. The name, bestowed by F.A. Bishop, chief engineer of the railroad, was in honor of Benjamin Henry Latrobe, II, chief engineer of the Baltimore and Ohio Railroad, America's first railroad. A post office operated at Latrobe from 1864 to 1921.

Geography
According to the Köppen Climate Classification system, Latrobe has a warm-summer Mediterranean climate, abbreviated "Csa" on climate maps.

References

Unincorporated communities in California
Unincorporated communities in El Dorado County, California
Populated places established in 1864